Jeffrey Michael Bourne (born 1976) is an American attorney and politician. He is a member of the Virginia House of Delegates from the 71st district, after winning a special election on February 7, 2017, to fill the seat vacated by Jennifer McClellan's election to the Senate of Virginia.

Early life and education
Born in Hartford, Connecticut, Bourne was raised in Richmond, Virginia, and graduated from George Wythe High School. He earned a Bachelor of Arts degree in economics from the College of William & Mary in 1999 and a Juris Doctor from the William & Mary Law School in 2007.

Career
Bourne works as a deputy attorney general for the state of Virginia. Previously, he has been deputy chief of staff to Richmond mayor Dwight Clinton Jones and head of government relations at the Richmond Redevelopment and Housing Authority.

In 2013, Bourne was elected to the Richmond School Board, representing the North Side 3rd district and serving two years as the board's chair. He was reelected in November 2016.

On February 7, 2017, Bourne won a special election to serve as the 71st District's Representative to the Virginia House of Delegates. He is a member of the Virginia Legislative Black Caucus.

After Congressman Donald McEachin died on November 28, 2022, Bourne was referenced as a possible candidate for the special election to fill his vacant House seat. Bourne later told Axios that he would not run for the seat.

Legislative issues 
Bourne's top legislative priorities are expanding educational opportunities to all students, providing schools with the resources they need, increasing housing availability and affordability in Richmond, and preserving Virginia's environment for the next generation.

The Virginia Education Association Fund for Children and Public Education has endorsed him because he has consistently voted for legislation supporting public education.

Personal life
Bourne is married and has two children.

References

External links
Official House of Delegates page
 (campaign finance)

Living people
Democratic Party members of the Virginia House of Delegates
Virginia lawyers
William & Mary Law School alumni
College of William & Mary alumni
School board members in Virginia
Politicians from Richmond, Virginia
21st-century American politicians
1976 births